Sandy Cove is a community in the Canadian province of Nova Scotia, located in the  Municipality of the District of Digby. in Digby County on Digby Neck. The community is the birthplace of Laurence Bradford Dakin.

See also 
Jerome of Sandy Cove
Nova Scotia

References
Sandy Cove on Destination Nova Scotia
Photo Fisheries and Oceans Canada

Communities in Digby County, Nova Scotia
General Service Areas in Nova Scotia